Heave-ho Slope is a slope falling  from Quarterdeck Ridge to a saddle at the southwest end of Hallett Peninsula, Antarctica. The slope must be traversed by parties moving overland from Hallett Station to Tucker Glacier, after the bay ice in Edisto Inlet has broken out. The New Zealand Geological Survey Antarctic Expedition, 1957–58, met deep soft new snow in this area and sledges had to be man-hauled up the slope in relays, hence the name.

References

Landforms of Victoria Land
Borchgrevink Coast